The 2016 Swiss Indoors was a men's tennis tournament played on indoor hard courts. It was the 47th edition of the event, and part of the 500 series of the 2016 ATP World Tour. It was held at the St. Jakobshalle in Basel, Switzerland, from 24 October through 30 October 2016. Fourth-seeded Marin Čilić won the singles title.

Points and prize money

Point distribution

Prize money

Singles main-draw entrants

Seeds

 Rankings are as of October 17, 2016

Other entrants
The following players received wildcards into the singles main draw:
 Marco Chiudinelli
 Juan Martín del Potro
 Henri Laaksonen

The following players received entry from the qualifying draw:
 Ričardas Berankis
 Robin Haase
 Donald Young
 Mischa Zverev

Withdrawals
Before the tournament
  Borna Ćorić →replaced by  Mikhail Youzhny
  Nick Kyrgios (suspension) →replaced by  Taylor Fritz
  Juan Mónaco →replaced by  Florian Mayer
  Rafael Nadal (wrist injury) →replaced by  Dušan Lajović

Retirements
  Richard Gasquet

Doubles main-draw entrants

Seeds

 Rankings are as of October 17, 2016

Other entrants
The following pairs received wildcards into the doubles main draw:
 Antoine Bellier /  Marco Chiudinelli
 Adrien Bossel /  Henri Laaksonen

The following pair received entry from the qualifying draw:
 Federico Delbonis /  Guido Pella

Finals

Singles

 Marin Čilić defeated  Kei Nishikori, 6–1, 7–6(7–5)

Doubles

  Marcel Granollers /  Jack Sock defeated  Robert Lindstedt /  Michael Venus, 6–3, 6–4

References

External links
Official website

2016 ATP World Tour
2016
2016 in Swiss tennis